This is a list of candidates in the 2022 Philippine Senate election.

Official candidates 
The Commission on Elections has published a final list of accepted candidates which are now included in the printed ballots.

Filed certificates of candidacies 
A total of 178 people filed candidacies for senator.

The following have filed certificates of candidacies, formally notifying the commission that they are running.

October 1

Abner Afuang (Independent), former mayor of Pagsanjan, Laguna, lost election in 2019
Lutgardo "Lutz" Barbo (PDP–Laban - Pacquiao Faction), former governor of Eastern Samar, former secretary of the Senate of the Philippines, and former president of Philippine Normal University
Bertito del Mundo, lost election in 2019 for representative of Tarlac's 3rd legislative district
Phil Delos Reyes, security guard
Francis "Chiz" Escudero (NPC), incumbent governor of Sorsogon and former senator, term limited in 2019
Bai Maylanie Esmael
Baldomero Falcone (Democratic Party), business consultant, lost election in 2013
Zigfrid Giron
Ana Theresia "Risa" Hontiveros (Akbayan), incumbent senator
Lorna Regina "Loren" Legarda (NPC), incumbent representative from Antique's at-large congressional district and former senator, term limited in 2019
Norman Marquez
Romeo Plasquita, retired cop and was declared nuisance candidate in the 2016 presidential polls. Also filed COC for Leyte governor in 2019.
Samuel Sanchez

October 2

Joel "Pastor" Apolinario, founder of alleged Ponzi firm Kapa Community Ministry International
Loreto "St. Loreto" Banosan
 Joseph Victor "JV" Ejercito (NPC), former senator, lost re-election in 2019
 Rodelo Pidoy, declared nuisance candidate in the 2010 presidential polls
Rafael "Raffy" Tulfo (Independent), broadcaster

October 3

Luz Aquino
Jose "Jinggoy" Estrada (PMP), senator from 2004 to 2016, lost election in 2019
Samira Gutoc (Aksyon), former member of the Bangsamoro Transition Commission and member of the ARMM Regional Legislative Assembly, lost election in 2019
Najar "Jinggoy Adang" Salih

October 4
Roberto Aniceto Jr. (Green Republican)
Pedro Austria (Green Republican)
Eleazar Calampiano (Green Republican)
Florencio Carlos (Green Republican)
Anthony Castro (Green Republican)
Rosita Maura Delos Angeles (Green Republican)
Bobby Francisco (Green Republican)
Junbert Guigayuma (Independent)
Claro Guzman (Green Republican)
Mario Mangco (Green Republican)
Marieta Mindalano-Adam (Katipunan ng Kamalayang Kayumanggi)
Edgar Miranda (Green Republican)
Jigger ND Pitos (Green Republican)
Maria Lourdes Santiago (Green Republican)
Narciso Solis, miner
Jennet "Genie" Tam, businesswoman and accountant

October 5
Lawin Arellano (Independent), lost in 2019
Orlando Bernardo
Joseph Dy
Paul Medard Escolano, lawyer
Norberto Esmeralda, Jr.
Lorenzo "Larry" Gadon (KBL), lawyer and perennial candidate, lost elections in 2016 and 2019
Samuel Aloysius Jardin
Nur-Ana "Lady Ann" Sahidulla (PDDS), former representative from Sulu's second congressional district, lost election in 2019

October 6
Nelson "Dodong" Ancajas
Herbert Constantine "Bistek" Bautista (NPC), former Mayor of Quezon City
Roy Cabonegro (PLM)
Paolo "Powee" Capino (Reporma), media practitioner
Panfilo "Jun" Dabandan Jr.
Monsour del Rosario III (Reporma), former representative from Makati's first congressional district
 (PLM)
Melissa Fortes
Elmer Labog (Makabayan), Chairman of Kilusang Mayo Uno
Sixto Lagare, lost election in 2016
Ponciano Leyte Jr.
Adz Nikabulin (Independent), lost election in 2010
Leo Olarte (Bigkis Pinoy), former Philippine Medical Association president
Ma. Dominga Cecilia "Minguita" Padilla (Reporma), Eye Bank Foundation president and former head executive staff of the Department of Health.
Joel Villanueva (Independent), incumbent senator
Mark Villar (Nacionalista), incumbent secretary of public works and highways
Carmen Zubiaga (Independent), chairperson of National Council on Disability Affairs
Juan Miguel "Migz" Zubiri (Independent), incumbent senator

October 7
Agnes Afable (Green Republican)
Shariff Ibrahim Albani (Labor Party)
Anita Alingod
Manuel Andrada (Save Phil)
Jesus Aranza, chair of Federation of Philippine Industries
Oscar Arcilla Jr. (Maharlika People's Party)
Rowena Awang, nurse
Agnes Bailen, former DBM undersecretary and staff of Miriam Defensor Santiago
Carlito "Carl" Balita (Aksyon), radio program host and infotainer
Jejomar Binay (UNA), former vice president of the Philippines
Arnel Paciano Casanova (Katipunan ng Nagkakaisang Pilipino)
Jose Castillo
Alan Peter Cayetano  (Nacionalista), incumbent representative of Taguig–Pateros's 1st district, former senator
Neri Colmenares (Makabayan), former representative of Bayan Muna, lost elections in 2016 and 2019
Ernesto Cruz
 (PLM)
Fernando Diaz (Pilipino para sa Pagbabago)
Jose Manuel Tadeo "Chel" Diokno (Katipunan ng Nagkakaisang Pilipino), founding dean of DLSU College of Law and chairman of Free Legal Assistance Group, lost election in 2019
Ashleah Ebad
Manolo Ebora, ship captain
Leodegario Estrella
Marcil Guay (Maharlika People's Party)
Rodolfo "RJ" Javellana (KDP)
Ali Kagui, soldier
Pedro Lopez
 (Independent), lost election in 2019
Roben Parashan (PROMDI)
Gilbert "Gibo" Teodoro (PRP), former secretary of National Defense
Reynaldo Valeros Jr. (KDP)

October 8
Iluminado Macalalad
Nur-Mahal "Princess Light" Kiram, daughter of Sultan Muhammad Mahakuttah Kiram
Eugenio "Kenny" Insigne, lawyer and former chairman of the National Commission on Indigenous Peoples
Bethsaida Lopez
Sherwin "Win" Gatchalian (NPC), incumbent senator
Silvestre Bello Jr. (PDP-Laban), elder brother of labor secretary Silvestre Bello III
Leila de Lima (Liberal), incumbent senator
Marianito Roque (Lakas–CMD), former labor secretary
Alexander "Alex" Lacson (Ang Kapatiran), lawyer and author, lost election in 2010
Vilma Detera
Luzviminda "Winnie" Calicdan
Emmanuel "Manny" Piñol (NPC), former Governor of Cotabato Province and former chairman of the Mindanao Development Authority
Melchor "Mel" Chavez (Labor Party), perennial candidate, lost election in 2001, 2007, 2016, and 2019
Rundy Montoya (Maharlika People's Party)
Francis Leo "FLM" Marcos, online personality
Paulo Mario Martelino (PRP)
Ruel Lamoste (Maharlika People's Party)
Arlene Josephine Butay (Labor Party)
Bilgadil Albani
Luther Meniano (Maharlika People's Party), lost election in 2019
Bandao Bansilan (Independent)
Ernesto Librando, lost election in 2016 for representative of Negros Occidental's 1st legislative district
Jesus Embuscado (Independent)
Ariel Lim (Independent)
Edgardo Los Baños
Joseph Agabon (Independent)
Pol Bulilan (Maharlika People's Party)
Gil Almasco (Independent)
Roger Pasa-an (Independent)
Mario Camba (Independent)
Aaron Soguillon (Maharlika People's Party)
Joed Serrano, film and concert producer
Vangie Abello (Independent), lost election in 2019
Gregorio "Gringo" Honasan (Independent), term-limited in 2019; later appointed as secretary of Information and Communications Technology
Rey Langit (PDP–Laban – Cusi Faction), broadcaster, lost election in 2016
Richard "Dick" Gordon (Bagumbayan–VNP), incumbent senator
Rodante Marcoleta (PDP–Laban – Cusi Faction), incumbent House deputy speaker and representative for SAGIP
Salvador "Sal" Panelo (PDP–Laban– Cusi Faction), incumbent chief presidential legal counsel, lost election in 1992
Antonio "Sonny" Trillanes IV (Liberal), term-limited in 2019
Robinhood Ferdinand "Robin" Padilla (PDP–Laban– Cusi Faction), actor
Greco Belgica (PDDS), incumbent Presidential Anti-Corruption Commission chairman, lost elections in 2013 and 2016
Teodoro "Teddy" Baguilat (Liberal), former representative from Ifugao's lone district
John Castriciones (PDP–Laban– Cusi Faction), incumbent secretary of Agrarian Reform
Lorenzo Cagote (Independent)
Elbern Suguipit (Green Republican)
Lynn Alegre (Partido Pederal ng Maharlika)
Wilfredo Red (Independent)
Julian "Ded Pul" Navarra (Independent)
Mona Liza Visorde (PDDS)
Antonio Alabata (Maharlika People's Party)
Astravel Pimentel-Naik (PDP–Laban– Cusi Faction), undersecretary of  Commission on Filipinos Overseas
Rosemarie Palacio (Maharlika People's Party)
Napoleon Capitulo Sr. (Independent)
Chelsa Tumaquin (Independent)
Lamberto Payongayong, fake lawyer
William Iliw-Iliw (Maharlika People's Party)
Christopher Cruz (KDP)
Loreto Tenulete Jr. (KDP)
Manuel Insigne (Independent)
Willie Ricablanca (Partido Maharlika)
Emily Mallillin (Partido Pederal ng Maharlika)
Edgar Avinado (Maharlika People's Party)
Henry Petrola (Independent)
Rex Noel (Independent)
Filipino Alvarado (Independent)
Ramon Bayron (Independent)
Elmer Francisco (PFP)
Ariel Mazo (Independent)
Tyson Tu (Independent)

Candidates who withdrew 
These individuals withdrew after filing their candidacies:

 Noli de Castro (Aksyon), former vice president of the Philippines, former senator
 De Castro withdrew his candidacy due to "personal reasons" that he did not disclose.
 Marianito Roque (Lakas), former secretary of Labor and Employment
Roque withdrew his bid for Senate on November 13, reasoning out that the electoral field is too crowded for him.
Paolo "Powee" Capino (Reporma), radio commentator, media practitioner, PWD advocate
 Capino backed out after falling behind polls. He officially withdrew his candidacy on November 15.
Jesus Durian Jr. (KDP)
 Durian withdrew his bid for Senate on November 15.
Loreto Tenolete Jr. (KDP)
 Tenolete withdrew his bid for Senate on November 15.
Paulo Mario Martelino (PRP)
 Martelino withdrew his bid for Senate on November 15.
Mona Liza Visorde (PRP)
 Visorde withdrew his bid for Senate on November 15.
 Rodrigo Duterte (PDDS), incumbent president of the Philippines
 Duterte withdrew his bid for Senate on December 14.
 Joed Serrano (Independent), film and concert producer 
 Serrano withdrew his bid for Senate on December 16.
Rodante Marcoleta (PDP–Laban), deputy speaker of the House of Representatives of the Philippines
 Marcoleta withdrew his bid for Senate on April 27.

Substitute candidates 
Rodrigo Duterte (PDDS), incumbent President of the Philippines
He substituted Mona Liza Visorde who withdrew on November 15, 2021.
Harry Roque (PRP), incumbent presidential spokesperson
He substituted Paulo Mario Martelino who withdrew on November 15, 2021.
Guillermo Eleazar (Reporma), former Chief of the Philippine National Police
He substituted Paolo Capino who withdrew on November 15, 2021.
 Jose Peter "Jopet" Sison (Aksyon), former National Home Mortgage Finance Corporation president, former Quezon City councilor, lawyer and TV host
 He substituted Noli de Castro who withdrew on October 13, 2021.
Joseph Ross Jocson (KDP), Metro Manila Development Authority board member, retired colonel, and former nominee of 1-Ang Trabahador na Pinoy Party-list
 He substituted Loreto Tenolete Jr. who withdrew on November 15, 2021.
Ramon Mitra III (KDP), son of former Speaker Ramon Mitra Jr., lost election in 2010
 He substituted Jesus Durian Jr. who withdrew on November 15, 2021.

Potential candidates 
Various personalities have directly or indirectly hinted on the possibility of running for senator in 2022. In other cases, sources have hinted on the possibility of certain candidates to run for senator in 2022. These were such people, but did not file candidacies for senator:

Grepor Belgica (PDP–Laban / PDDS), incumbent presidential adviser on religious affairs
After giving way for Bong Go in the presidency, it was reported that Belgica was to substitute one of PDDS' senatorial candidates, and would have run alongside his son, Greco, and President Duterte.
Silvestre Bello III (PDP-Laban / Lakas-CMD), incumbent secretary of Labor and Employment, lost election in 2010.
Karlo Nograles (PDP-Laban– Cusi Faction), incumbent Cabinet Secretariat
Dakila Carlo "Dax" Cua (PDP-Laban– Cusi Faction), incumbent governor of Quirino

Declined to be candidates 
Individuals below have been speculated to run in this election, but have since denied their interest in running.
Emmanuel "Manny" Pacquiao (PDP–Laban – Pacquiao Faction / PROMDI), incumbent senator
Pacquiao was initially invited by PDP-Laban's opposing faction to run under their Senate slate. He declined and eventually proceeded to run for president.
Bam Aquino (Liberal), former senator
Aquino dropped his bid to serve full-time as Leni Robredo's campaign manager.
Arthur "Art" Tugade (Reform Party), incumbent secretary of Transportation
Teodoro "Teddy Boy" Locsin Jr. (PDP–Laban), incumbent secretary of Foreign Affairs
Delfin "Del" Lorenzana, incumbent secretary of National Defense
Bernadette Fatima "Berna" Romulo-Puyat, incumbent secretary of Tourism
Martin Andanar, incumbent Presidential Communications Operations Office secretary 
Benjamin "Benhur" Abalos Jr. (PDP-Laban– Cusi Faction), incumbent chairman of Metropolitan Manila Development Authority
Gregorio Larrazabal, former Commission on Elections commissioner
Larrazabal would instead seek the post to be vacated by Lucy Torres-Gomez.
 Martin Romualdez (Lakas-CMD), incumbent House majority floor leader and representative from Leyte's 1st district, lost election in 2016
Amidst rumors of vice presidential or senatorial runs, Romualdez filed for reelection.
Vilma Santos (Nacionalista), incumbent House deputy speaker and representative from Batangas' 6th district
Lucy Torres-Gomez (PDP–Laban), incumbent representative from Leyte's 4th district
Torres would instead seek the current post of her husband, incumbent Mayor Richard Gomez of Ormoc.
Gwendolyn Garcia (PDP–Laban), incumbent governor of Cebu
Garcia turned down the idea of running for Senate around April. She eventually filed for reelection.
Willie Revillame, TV host
A day before the deadline of filing of candidacies, Revillame announced on his TV show Wowowin that he won't be running for senator after being urged by President Duterte to do so, saying that he could help even not in public office
 Angel Locsin, actress
Locsin ruled out the idea of entering national politics, as she considers actresses such as herself as public servants.
Coco Martin, actor

References 

2022 Philippine general election